Bilaspur Airport , officially known as Bilasa Devi Kevat Airport is located at Chakarbhatta, 10 kilometres south of Bilaspur, in the state of Chhattisgarh, India.  Bilaspur Airport made by Royal Air Force in 1942 oldest Airport of chhattisgarh.  It is owned by the Airports Authority of India. In 1980s, the airport was used by Vayudoot to provide flights to Bhopal, Nagpur, Mumbai and Delhi.  Currently commercial scheduled flight are operating from the airport to Indore, Delhi, Jabalpur, Allahabad.

History
Built in 1942 it opened as RAF Station Bilaspur Royal Air Force (RAF), in the Central Provinces of British India. It was used as an airfield during World War II. It was used by 267 Squadron, 96 Squadron, 10 Squadron and other units. 673 Squadron undertook sporadic glider training and courses in jungle warfare in 1945 in Bilaspur. It never undertook operational duties because of the Japanese surrender. Some operational missions were undertaken however by pilots of this squadron detached to other units flying Dakotas and L-5 Sentinels. The squadron disbanded at Kargi Road, Bilaspur airstrip on 25 October 1945. After India got independence from Great Britain, the airfield was transferred to the war department of the Indian Government. The Directorate General of Civil Aviation (DGCA) took control of the airport, followed by the Ministry of Civil Aviation.

Bilaspur was associated with Nagpur, Aurangabad, Mumbai, Raipur, Bhopal in 1988 through Vayudoot service.

The Indian Army intends to take over the airport and establish a training facility for the special forces. The existing para-military commando training facility at Nahan, Himachal Pradesh is to be shifted to Bilaspur, Chhattisgarh. The Army wants use of the entire airport while AAI has made a "conditional offer" of parting with 377 acres while retaining 56 acres for a civil enclave.  On 7 December 2018 Bilaspur Airport got the commercial licence from Directorate General of Civil Aviation (India) for operating (19 seater Aircraft 2C VFR category) commercial flights. On 27 January 2021 Bilaspur Airport got the commercial licence from Directorate General of Civil Aviation (India) for operating (72 seater Aircraft 3C VFR category) commercial flights.

On 27 January 2021 Bilaspur Airport got the commercial licence from Directorate General of Civil Aviation (India) for operating (72 seater Aircraft 3C VFR category) commercial flights. On 2 February 2021, Union Civil Aviation Minister, Hardeep Singh Puri announced that commercial flight services will be operational from Bilaspur airport to Prayagraj, Delhi, Bhopal, Jabalpur from 1 March 2021.

Airfield
Elevation of the airfield is 276 metres above mean sea level.

Runway 17/35 is 1,535 metres long and 30 metres wide with turning pads at both ends.  A 630 metre long taxiway connects the runway to a small Helipad cum apron.

The runway is too small for the large commercial aircraft like Boeing 737 and Airbus A 320, which need a 2,190 metres in length and 45 metres in width (6,860 ft.) takeoff distance.  This means many low-cost carriers like AirAsia India and GoAir, which use a single plane type, cannot serve the airport until the runway is upgraded.

Airlines and destinations

Statistics

Indefinite strike

On 26 October 2019, numbers of local residents sat on an indefinite strike to protest against the Central and State Government for demanding Air connectivity in Bilaspur at a City Townhall named Raghvendra Rao Bhawan. Their demands were as follows: Bilaspur Should get a Full-fledged 4C Airport; Connectivity to Metro cities like Delhi, Mumbai, Chennai, Bengaluru; Runway extension of the Airport in order to accommodate wide-bodied Aircraft in Bilaspur Airport.

As of March 2021. Bilaspur Airport has been operationalized for 3C operation and having 4X weekly flights to Delhi via Jabalpur and Allahabad. Local residents of Bilaspur district continuing their strike by asking for Airport up-gradation from 3C to 4C Category.

Social media reaction

People of Bilaspur started gathering on social media Twitter and Instagram start tweeting/posting for Air connectivity in Bilaspur to tag twitter handles of Ministry of Civil Aviation, Chhattisgarh Chief Minister, Member of Parliament and Legislative Assembly of Bilaspur Constituency to draw their attention towards development of Bilaspur Airport and demand their action on it. A Social media group named "BAAC" (Bilaspur Airport Awareness Campaign) on Twitter led the hashtags related tweets of Bilaspur Airport and provide important information and updates regarding Bilaspur Airport to its followers.

See also
 Swami Vivekananda International Airport, Raipur
 Jagdalpur Airport
 Jharsuguda Airport
 List of airports in India
 List of the busiest airports in India

References

External links

Bilaspur, Chhattisgarh
Airports in Chhattisgarh
Military airbases established in 1942
1942 establishments in India